The National Association of Intercollegiate Athletics (NAIA) Football National Championship is decided by a post-season playoff system featuring the best NAIA college football teams in the United States.  Under sponsorship of the National Association of Intercollegiate Athletics, the championship game has been played annually since 1956.  In 1970, NAIA football was divided into two divisions, Division I and Division II, with a championship game played in each division.  In 1997, NAIA football was again consolidated into one division.  The 2019 game was played at the Eddie G. Robinson Stadium in Grambling, Louisiana.

Texas A&I (now known as Texas A&M–Kingsville) is still the most prolific program with seven NAIA championships, despite having been in NCAA Division II since 1980. Carroll (MT) are the most successful team still playing at the NAIA level, with 6 national titles.

Northwestern College  is the current champion, having defeated the Keiser Seahawks in the 2022 championship, 35-25.

Game name
Over the years, the NAIA championship games were played under a variety of names: 
Aluminum Bowl (1956)
Holiday Bowl (1957–1960)
Camellia Bowl (1961–1963)
Champion Bowl (1964–1976 and 1980–1996, Division I games only)
Apple Bowl (1977, Division I game only)
Palm Bowl (1978–1979, Division I games only)

A separate NAIA Division II Football National Championship was played between 1970 and 1996, when there were two divisions at the NAIA level.

Results

Championships by school

 NAIA Division II titles are not included in this list. 

Programs that no longer compete in NAIA are indicated in italics with a pink background.

See also
 List of NAIA football programs
 List of NAIA National Football Championship Series appearances by team
 NAIA Division II Football National Championship
 NCAA Division I-FCS Football Championship
 NCAA Division II Football Championship
 NCAA Division III Football Championship

References